Rwanda Development Board (RDB), is a government department that integrates all government agencies responsible for the attraction, retention and facilitation of investments in the national economy.

Location
The headquarters of RDB are located on KG 220 Street, in Kigali, the capital and largest city of Rwanda.

Overview
The Rwanda Development Board (RDB) was established in 2009 to coordinate, spur and promote national economic development. RDB includes agencies responsible for "business registration, investment promotion, environmental clearances, privatization and specialist agencies which support the priority sectors of ICT and tourism as well as SMEs and human capacity development in the private sector". The Executive Director's position, is a cabinet-level position and the incumbent is appointed by and reports directly to the president of Rwanda. RDB measures its achievements in (a) direct foreign and domestic investments, (b) increased exports and (c) number of jobs created.

Management
As of September 2017, the senior managers in the RDB include the following:
1. Clare Akamanzi, the executive director and chief executive officer 2. Emmanuel Hategeka, the chief operating officer 3. Mark Nkurunziza, the chief financial officer 4. Belise Kariza, the chief tourism officer 5. Winifred Ngangure, the acting head of the Investment Promotion Department 6. Eugene Mutangana, the head of the Conservation Department and 7. Louise Kanyonga, the registrar general.

See also
 Parliament of Rwanda

References

External links
Website of Rwanda Development Board

Government of Rwanda
Finance in Rwanda
Organizations established in 2009
Kigali
2009 establishments in Rwanda
Investment promotion agencies